Mikhail Yuryevich Sidorov (born Moscow, 19 November 1986) is a Russian rugby union player who plays as a flanker.

He played for Slava Moscow. He went on a loan to Yenisey-STM Krasnoyarsk in October 2015, so he could play at the European Rugby Challenge Cup.

He had 6 caps for Russia, from 2011 to 2016, scoring 1 try, 5 points on aggregate. He was called for the 2011 Rugby World Cup, playing in two games without scoring.

References

External links
Mikhail Sidorov International Statistics

1986 births
Living people
Russian rugby union players
Russia international rugby union players
Slava Moscow players
Yenisey-STM Krasnoyarsk players
Rugby union flankers
Sportspeople from Moscow